Golden Beach may refer to:

Golden Beach, Queensland, Australia, a suburb
Golden Beach, Victoria, Australia, a settlement
Golden Beach (Paros), Greece, a beach
Golden Beach, Cyprus, Cyprus, a wide remote sand beach
Golden Beach (Hong Kong), a public beach
Golden Beach, Chennai, India, a beach
Golden Beach, Florida, United States, a town
Golden Beach, Maryland, United States, a census-designated place

See also
Golden Sands, Bulgaria